Muhammad Rizky Darmawan (born 5 February 1994) is an Indonesian professional footballer who plays as a goalkeeper for Liga 1 club Persita Tangerang.

Career statistics

Club

Honours

Club

Persija Jakarta
 Liga 1: 2018
 Indonesia President's Cup: 2018

References

External links
 Rizky Darmawan at Soccerway
 Rizky Darmawan at Liga Indonesia

1994 births
Living people
People from Tangerang
Sportspeople from Banten
Indonesian footballers
Indonesian Premier Division players
Liga 1 (Indonesia) players
Persitara Jakarta Utara players
Persija Jakarta players
Persita Tangerang players
Mitra Kukar players
Sriwijaya F.C. players
PSS Sleman players
Association football goalkeepers